Vicky Angel is a children's book by Jacqueline Wilson, about a young girl's struggle with her grief over losing her best friend, Vicky. It was first published in 2000.

Plot summary
Vicky and Jade are best friends. Vicky is a flamboyant and outgoing girl while Jade is shy and timid and usually follows Vicky's lead. After fighting about which extra-curricular activity to take together and arguing as Jade finally sticks up for herself, Vicky dashes out on to the road without looking and is struck by a car. Jade travels to the hospital in the ambulance with Vicky, however Vicky dies from her internal injuries in hospital. Distraught and in shock, Jade runs from the hospital. However, just an hour after her death Vicky appears to Jade as a spirit, although she is the only one who can see or hear her. Jade attends Vicky's funeral, and afterwards is revisited by Vicky's spirit. When Jade returns to school, she is encouraged to attend the fun-running activity Vicky had signed them up for. There, she makes an unlikely friend in Fatboy Sam, who Jade originally assumed had a crush on Vicky; he later reveals it was on Jade that he had a crush. However, Vicky is snide about her friendship with Sam, influencing Jade into saying cruel things to him, although he forgives her.

As Jade tries to get used to life without Vicky, or at least without a Vicky that other people can see, Vicky's spectre becomes more and more controlling. Jade is forced to do as Vicky wishes, and can't get on with her life and make new friends. Jade finally goes to a Bereavement counsellor and discovers how to control Vicky. Eventually she must attend the inquest into Vicky's death. During it, she is overcome with guilt and emotion when trying to recall Vicky's death and she flees the court building, running down the street and into the road where she is nearly hit by a car. Vicky appears and pulls her back. Vicky tells Jade that the accident was not her fault, freeing her from her guilt. After saving Jade's life, Vicky grows angel wings and can finally move on, floating into the sky and leaving Jade to move on with her life.

Characters
Vicky Waters: The title character of the story who dies after running out to the road without looking and being struck by a car. She appears to her best friend Jade as a ghost (see Vicky's ghost below) and tells her what to do. She is very confident and flamboyant, while Jade tends to follow.
Jade Marshall: Vicky's best friend who finds it hard to cope over Vicky's death. She is more timid than Vicky, tending to follow her lead rather than doing things for herself, such as wanting to join a drama club but not doing it if Vicky won't.
Sam:  Often known as Fatboy Sam, he is the class clown of Vicky and Jade's class and as his nickname suggests, is very fat. He understands how Jade felt after Vicky died and has a crush on Jade, which Jade thinks was a crush on Vicky which Sam transferred over to her. However, he explains to Jade that she was the girl he had a crush on, as Vicky was mean when she was alive.
Madeleine: A chubby but sweet girl who likes pink and white colours, Vicky calls her Marshmallow Madeleine due to this. She becomes good friends with Jade.
Jenny: One of Madeleine's best friends, she has been known to have a lot of boyfriends, including Ryan Harper, who was Vicky's boyfriend until she died.
Vicky-Two: Another of Madeleine's best friends, she is a very different girl to the late Vicky, a cheeky, bouncy tomboy who Madeleine and Jenny call Vicky after the late Vicky dies, which Jade gets angry at.
Anne Cambridge: The French teacher at Jade's school. She is strict when teaching but is a nice person and suggests that Jade speaks to Stevie Wainwright, a grief counselor.
Stevie Wainwright: Anne Cambridge's vicar friend who wears flowery trousers and visits the local shopping center. She lost her only child, Jessica when she died from leukaemia, aged 5. Stevie comes to Jade's school after Vicky dies because she has done a grief counselling course. She helps Jade forget about Vicky.

Vicky's ghost
Before the start of the novel, Wilson states that many people have asked her if Vicky is really there, or if it is just Jade's imagination. She says that "You will have to make up your own mind!"

Jade could be imagining Vicky, as she encourages Jade to commit suicide by jumping off a moving train. Since Jade is devastated over Vicky's death and blames herself for it, this could be her imagination.
Vicky could really be there as, although Jade learns to keep Vicky away from her towards the end of the book, she cannot control Vicky's emotions or actions.

References 

2000 British novels
British children's novels
Novels by Jacqueline Wilson
Children's books about friendship
Doubleday (publisher) books
2000 children's books
Novels about friendship